The Commander of Air Force Research Laboratory (AFRL) is responsible for managing the Air Force's science and technology program as well as additional customer funded research and development.  The commander is also responsible for a workforce of approximately 10,800 people in the laboratory's component technology directorates, the Air Force Office of Scientific Research, and the 711th Human Performance Wing.

Below is a list of commanders of Air Force Research Laboratory and the terms in office.

List of commanders of the Air Force Research Laboratory

References

Air Force Research Laboratory Commanders
Air Force Research Laboratory people